The 1984–85 Bulgarian Hockey League season was the 33rd season of the Bulgarian Hockey League, the top level of ice hockey in Bulgaria. Five teams participated in the league, and HK Slavia Sofia won the championship.

Regular season

Final 
 HK Slavia Sofia - Levski-Spartak Sofia 6:5

Bulgaria
Bulgarian Hockey League seasons
Bulg